Chilton is an English surname. Notable people with the surname include:

Allenby Chilton (1918–1996), English football player
Alex Chilton (1950–2010), American singer-songwriter, guitarist, record producer, the lead singer of the Box Tops
Bart Chilton (1960–2019), commissioner on the Commodity Futures Trading Commission
Charles Chilton (1917–2013), BBC radio presenter, a writer and a producer
Charles Chilton (zoologist) (1860–1929), New Zealand
Chris Chilton (1943–2021), British footballer
David Chilton (1951–1997), pastor and Christian Reconstructionist
David Barr Chilton, Canadian financial author
Frederick Oliver Chilton Australian brigadier
Glen Chilton, Canadian-Australian professor, author, ornithologist and behavioural ecologist
Horace Chilton (1853–1932), printer, lawyer, and Democratic US Senator from Texas
James Chilton (c. 1556 – 1620), Mayflower settler
John Chilton (1932–2016), British jazz trumpeter and writer
Kevin Patrick "Chily" Chilton (born 1954), 4-star general in the USAF and NASA astronaut
Mark Chilton (born 1976), British cricketer
Mark H. Chilton (born 1970), mayor of Carrboro, North Carolina
Mary Chilton (1607 – c. 1679), passenger on the Mayflower

 Maurice Chilton (1898–1956) British Army officer
Max Chilton (born 1991) British racing driver competing in Formula 1
Robert H. Chilton (1815–1879), brigadier general in the Confederate States Army during the American Civil War; chief of staff for Robert E. Lee
Selina Chilton (born 1981), English actress
Shirley Chilton (1923–2013), American businesswoman and politician
Thomas Chilton (1798–1854), U.S. Representative from Kentucky, Baptist clergyman, ghost writer of David Crockett's autobiography
Thomas H. Chilton (1899–1972), chemical engineer and professor
Tom Chilton (born 1985), British auto racing driver
Tom Chilton (game developer) for the World of Warcraft game
William Chilton (printer) (1815–1855), British printer, socialist, atheist, and evolutionist
William E. Chilton (1856–1939), United States Senator from West Virginia
William Parish Chilton (1810–1871), lawyer, jurist, and politician serving Alabama and later the Confederate States of America

English-language surnames
English toponymic surnames